Rexford Tullius (born March 10, 1987) is a swimmer from Port Orange, Florida. He competed at the 2016 Summer Olympics for the United States Virgin Islands in the men's 200 metre backstroke; his time of 1:59.14 in the heats did not qualify him for the semifinals.

References

1987 births
Living people
United States Virgin Islands male swimmers
Olympic swimmers of the United States Virgin Islands
Swimmers at the 2016 Summer Olympics
Male backstroke swimmers
Medalists at the 2011 Summer Universiade
Universiade silver medalists for the United States
Universiade medalists in swimming
Pan American Games gold medalists for the United States
Swimmers at the 2011 Pan American Games
Pan American Games medalists in swimming
Medalists at the 2011 Pan American Games